Leila Meskhi was the defending champion, but chose to compete at Bayotte in the same week.

Larisa Savchenko-Neiland won the title by defeating Barbara Rittner 3–6, 6–3, 6–4 in the final.

Seeds

Draw

Finals

Top half

Bottom half

References

External links
 ITF tournament profile

St. Petersburg \Open
Moscow Ladies Open
September 1991 sports events in Russia